is a Japanese professional footballer who plays as a centre back for J1 League club Gamba Osaka.

Playing career
Shota Fukuoka joined to J2 League club; Shonan Bellmare in 2014. In 2015, he moved on loan to J3 League club; Fukushima United FC.

Career statistics

References

External links
Profile at Gamba Osaka

1995 births
Living people
Association football people from Tokyo Metropolis
Japanese footballers
J2 League players
J3 League players
Shonan Bellmare players
Fukushima United FC players
J.League U-22 Selection players
Tochigi SC players
Tokushima Vortis players
Gamba Osaka players
Association football defenders
People from Nishitōkyō, Tokyo